Warrick De'Mon Dunn (born January 5, 1975) is an American former professional football player who was a running back in the National Football League (NFL) for twelve seasons.  He was drafted by the Tampa Bay Buccaneers 12th overall in the 1997 NFL Draft, after playing college football for the Florida State Seminoles.  Dunn was named AP NFL Offensive Rookie of the Year in 1997 and earned three Pro Bowl selections in his career.  After his playing career, Dunn took a minority stake in the Falcons' ownership group led by Arthur Blank.

Early years
At Catholic High in Baton Rouge, Louisiana, Dunn played quarterback, cornerback, and running back. During his sophomore year, he helped lead Catholic High to the state 4A championship game for the first time in its history. He was an All-America honorable mention selection by USA Today as a senior.

On January 7, 1993, two days after Dunn's eighteenth birthday, his mother Betty Smothers, a Baton Rouge Police Officer, was murdered while working an off-duty security job.  Dunn became the head of his family and raised his siblings.  He later met with one of his mother's killers, Kevan Brumfield, and offered his forgiveness.

College career
Dunn played college football at Florida State University, where he rushed for over 1,000 yards in 3 straight seasons. He graduated in 1997 with a bachelor's degree in information studies. He was a three-time All-ACC selection.

Dunn's jersey, along with those of other Seminoles players such as Fred Biletnikoff, Ron Sellers, Ron Simmons, Charlie Ward, Deion Sanders, and Chris Weinke, has been retired by the university. His number (28) may still be worn by Seminole players, but his jersey will be displayed in the Moore Athletic Center at FSU. He also won a national championship in 1993 with Florida State.

Track and field
Warrick Dunn was also an accomplished track and field star, named as an Associated Press All-American as a member of Florida State's men's 4x100m relay team.  Dunn competed on the Seminoles' track & field team as a sprinter during all four years he was enrolled at Florida State. His personal best in the 100 meters is 10.3 seconds.

College statistics

Professional career

First stint with Buccaneers
Dunn was selected in the first round of the 1997 NFL Draft with the 12th overall pick by the Tampa Bay Buccaneers. Dunn had a highly successful rookie season, was selected to the NFC Pro Bowl team, and named the Associated Press Offensive Rookie of the Year. Dunn spent the next four years of his career in Tampa Bay, and was again named to the Pro Bowl in 2000. In game 13 of that season, he had a career-best 210 yards rushing against the Dallas Cowboys (then, 2nd most in franchise history).

Atlanta Falcons
A free agent in the 2002 offseason, Dunn signed with the Atlanta Falcons. Once again, he made a positive impact on his team with 9 total TDs and in that year, he led the league with a 5.4 yards per carry average. Dunn scored the most rushing touchdowns in his career, 9, in the 2004 season despite splitting carries with T.J. Duckett and also led the team in rushing with 1,106 yards. Having led his team in rushing yards again in 2005, Dunn was named the NFC's Pro Bowl team, marking his third selection to the team. For his career, Dunn has only missed 10 games and has a total of 2,256 carries for 9,461 yards 43 touchdowns and a 4.2 average.  Dunn finished his first 10 seasons with over 1,000 combined rushing and receiving yards.  During the 2007 season, with Falcons starting quarterback Byron Leftwich out with a high ankle sprain, Dunn served as the third string emergency quarterback behind Joey Harrington and Chris Redman, a position he played in high school.

On March 3, 2008, the Falcons released Dunn per his request. This came a day after the Falcons signed former San Diego Chargers backup running back Michael Turner. On December 17, 2009, he became a minority owner of the Atlanta Falcons.

Second stint with Buccaneers
On March 10, 2008, Dunn returned to the Buccaneers after signing a two-year, $6 million contract. In week 6 against the Carolina Panthers, Dunn had his first 100-yard game since re-joining the Buccaneers. Dunn was released by the Buccaneers on February 25, 2009. He retired from the NFL 14th all-time in all-purpose yards with 15,306 (20th ) and 19th in rushing yards with 10,967 (23rd ).

NFL career statistics

Falcons franchise records
's NFL off-season, Warrick Dunn has held at least 11 Falcons franchise records, including:
 Rush Yards: playoffs (310), playoff game (142 on 2005-01-15 STL)
 Rush Yds/Att: playoffs (5.08), playoff season (6.28 in 2004), playoff game (8.35 on 2005-01-15 STL)
 Rushing TDs: playoffs (3), playoff season (3 in 2004), playoff game (2 on 2005-01-15 STL)
 Rush Yds/Game: playoffs (77.5), playoff season (100.5 in 2004)
 100+ yard rushing games: playoffs (1, tied with Jamal Anderson and Michael Vick)

Buccaneers franchise records
He also has held at least 5 Buccaneers franchise records, including:
 Receptions: game (12 on 2001-11-18 CHI), playoffs (26), playoff game (8 on 2002-01-12 @PHI)
 All Purpose Yds: playoff season (271 in 1999)
 1000+ rushing yard seasons: career (2, tied with 3 others)

Personal life
Dunn established the Homes for the Holidays (HFTH) program in 1997, and started Warrick Dunn Charities (WDC) in 2002 as a way to grow programs and services. The HFTH program rewards single-parent families for reaching first-time homeownership. HFTH recipient families are chosen through a partnership with Habitat for Humanity affiliates and WDC with complete home furnishings and down-payment assistance. As of July 2012, HFTH has assisted over 150 single parents and over 300 dependents in Atlanta, Baton Rouge, Tampa and Tallahassee. By providing families with a positive home environment, WDC believes that children can thrive educationally, socially and economically. In 2006, one of those homes happened to go to the family of future NFL player Deshaun Watson. Watson went on to play quarterback for Clemson and win the 2017 College Football Playoff National Championship.

Dunn's achievements have been recognized over the years. He received a Giant Steps Award in civic leadership from former President Bill Clinton for his program. In 2005, Dunn was presented with the Walter Payton Man of the Year Award. This award is the only NFL award that recognizes a player for his community service as well as for his excellence on the field. In the aftermath of Hurricane Katrina, Dunn challenged all NFL players, except for those who play for the New Orleans Saints, to donate at least $5,000 to the effort. The effort received over $5 million in contributions.

In 2007, Dunn, along with Andre Agassi, Muhammad Ali, Lance Armstrong, Jeff Gordon, Mia Hamm, Tony Hawk, Andrea Jaeger, Jackie Joyner-Kersee, Mario Lemieux, Alonzo Mourning and Cal Ripken Jr., founded Athletes for Hope, a charitable organization that helps professional athletes, sports industry professionals and fans get involved in charitable causes.
For his exceptional involvement on and off the field, Dunn was awarded with the 2009 Bart Starr Award. He also received a Jefferson Award for Outstanding Athlete in Service and Philanthropy in 2011.

Writing
Dunn's 2008 autobiography, Running For My Life , details his mother's murder and his battles with depression throughout his life.

References

External links

The Warrick Dunn Foundation
Athletes for Hope

Players of American football from Baton Rouge, Louisiana
Catholic High School (Baton Rouge, Louisiana) alumni
American football running backs
Florida State Seminoles football players
Tampa Bay Buccaneers players
Atlanta Falcons players
National Football League Offensive Rookie of the Year Award winners
National Conference Pro Bowl players
1975 births
Living people
Ed Block Courage Award recipients